This was the tenth edition of Los Premios 40 Principales, the annual awards organized by Spanish music radio Los 40 Principales. It was held on December 11, 2015 in Madrid's Barclaycard Center. The nominees were announced on October 8, 2015.

This is the last edition before the awards were rebranded as Los 40 Music Awards, due to the station shortening its name to just Los 40.

Performers

Awards and nominations
The following is the full list of winners and nominees.

Best Spanish Act
Pablo Alborán
Melendi
Fito & Fitipaldis
Alejandro Sanz
Enrique Iglesias

Best Spanish New Act
Calum
Amelie
Electric Nana
Álvaro Soler
Dasoul

Best Spanish Song
Melendi - Tocado y hundido
Alejandro Sanz - Un zombie a la intemperie
Dvicio - Enamórate
Juan Magán ft. Paulina Rubio & DCS - Vuelve
Pablo Alborán - Pasos de cero

Best Spanish Video
Pablo Alborán - Pasos de cero
Efecto Pasillo - Cuando me siento bien
Alejandro Sanz - Un zombie a la intemperie
Sweet California - Wonderwoman
Macaco - Hijos de un mismo dios

Best Spanish Album
Alejandro Sanz - Sirope
Melendi - Un alumno más
Pablo Alborán - Terral
Auryn - Circus Avenue
Fito & Fitipaldis - Huyendo conmigo de mí

Best Festival, Tour or Concert in Spain
Pablo Alborán - Tour Terral
Fito & Fitipaldis - Gira Huyendo conmigo de mí
Alejandro Sanz - Gira Sirope
Maldita Nerea - Gira Mira dentro
Maná - Cama incendiada Tour

Best International Act
Ellie Goulding
Maroon 5
Ed Sheeran
Sia
Taylor Swift

Best International New Act
Meghan Trainor
Sam Smith
Hozier
Robin Schulz
Måns Zelmerlöw

Best International Song
Ed Sheeran - "Thinking Out Loud"
Sia - "Chandelier"
Mark Ronson ft. Bruno Mars - "Uptown Funk"
Ellie Goulding - "Love Me Like You Do"
Sam Smith - "Stay with Me"

Best International Video
Sia - "Chandelier"
Hozier - "Take Me to Church"
Meghan Trainor - "All About That Bass"
Taylor Swift - "Shake It Off"
Madcon - "Don't Worry"

Best International Album
Sam Smith - In the Lonely Hour
Taylor Swift - 1989
David Guetta - Listen
Maroon 5 - V
Sia - 1000 Forms of Fear

Best Latin Act
Paulina Rubio
Nicky Jam
Maná
Gente de Zona
Prince Royce

Honorable Mention
Best Spanish rock act: Fito & Fitipaldis

References

Los Premios 40 Principales
2015 music awards
2015 in Spanish music